3x3 basketball competitions at the 2021 Junior Pan American Games in Cali, Colombia will take place November 28–30, 2021.

Medal table

Medalists

Final standings

Qualification

For each 3x3 tournament, the top 12 teams in each gender in the world rankings as of November 1, 2020 qualified. Host nation Colombia is the recipient of a wild card in case isn't in the ranking, if is, the quota will be given to the next best positioned.

See also
 Basketball at the 2020 Summer Olympics

References

External links
Results book – Basketball
Results book – 3x3 Basketball

Basketball
 
2021
2021–22 in South American basketball
2021–22 in North American basketball
International basketball competitions hosted by Colombia